Euzona aurita is a species of tiger beetle in the genus Euzona.

References

Cicindelidae
Beetles described in 1904